Narelle Moras (born 6 May 1956) is an Australian former swimmer. She competed in two events at the 1972 Summer Olympics.

References

External links
 

1956 births
Living people
Australian female freestyle swimmers
Olympic swimmers of Australia
Swimmers at the 1972 Summer Olympics
Place of birth missing (living people)